Fırat Kaya (born 2 January 1995) is a Germany-born Turkish footballer. He is a member of the Turkey national deaf football team.

Private life
Fırat Kaya was born to Turkish-descent parents,Yıldırım and Sevg, as the youngest of two children in Schwäbisch Hall, Germany on 2 January 1995. The hearing loss boy started to play football at a young age.

Club career
At age 15, Kaya became an amateur footballer playing as a forward in the youth teams of VfR Mannheim (2010–203). His professional career started with Eintracht Plankstadt (2013–14). He later played for the teams VfR Mannheim (2013–14), SF Schwäbisch Hall (2014–15),TSV Nellmersbach (2015–16), TSG Giengen (2015–16), SC 04 Schwabach (2016–17)  and TSV Kornburg (2017–18. While playing again for SF Schwäbisch Hall (2018–19) in Germany, he moved to Turkey and signed a five-month contract with Tokatspor in January 2019. He played in nine matches of the 2018–19 TFF Second League's second half and scored two goals. He became so the first hearing-loss footballer to play in the Turkish professional football leagues. After the end of the Turkish league season, the right-wing forward returned to Germany, and joined TSG Öhringen (2019–20). The next season, he signed a one-year contract with the Verbandsliga Württemberg club SV Fellbach (2020–21) in the beginning of September 2020. In his club career in Germany and Turkey between 2013 and 2021, he scored a total of 15 goals in 48 matches he played in the Bayernliga Süd, Landesliga Bayern-Süd/Oberbayern, Turkish TFF Second League, Verbandsliga Württemberg and Landespokal Württemberg.

International career
Germany national deaf football team
Kaya became a member of the Germany national deaf football team, and participated at the 2013 Summer Deaflympics in Sofia, Bulgaria. He scored one goal in five matches. He enjoyed his team's third place.

Turkey national deaf football team
He later preferred to join the Turkey national deaf football team.  He took part in all six matches of the 2017 Summer Deaflympics held in Samsun, Turkey. He scored one goal in the match against Venezuela, and another goal in the tournament's final match against Ukraine.  He enjoyed his team's champion title. He played in the qualification group match for European Championship against England. He netted two goals in the match, which Turkey won by 5–0. He played in the 
qualification match for the EuroDeaf 2019 against Czech Republic in June 2018, and was instrumental for Turkey's qualification with 1-0 scoring the winning goal. He played in five matches at the Euro 2019 held in Heraklion, Greece. He was named "Top goalscorer" of the championship with 9 goals netted in four matches.

He played in two matches of the 2022 Summer Deaflympics qualification round against Czech Republic and France.  He scored one goal in the match against Czech Republic, which ended 6-0 for Turkey. Winning over the both teams, the national team qualified for the Games to be held in Caxias do Sul, Brazil.

Honours

Individual
Turkey national deaf football team
Top goalscorer (1): EuroDeaf 2019 (9 goals)

International
Germany national deaf football team
Third places (1): 2013 Summer Deaflympics

Turkey national deaf football team
Champions (1): 2017 Summer Deaflympics

References

External links
Fırat Kaya @ Deaflympics

1995 births
Living people
People from Schwäbisch Hall
Sportspeople from Stuttgart (region)
German people of Turkish descent
Footballers from Baden-Württemberg
German deaf people
Deaf association football players
German footballers
VfR Mannheim players
Germany international footballers
Association football forwards
Turkish footballers
Players of deaf football